Vatsala Deshmukh (1930 – 12 March 2022) was an Indian Marathi and Hindi actress.

Life and career
Deshmukh started her career as a model and later joined the show business. She made her screen debut with the Hindi movie "Toofan and Deeya", directed by Prabhat Kumar.

Deshmukh's younger sister, Vijaya Deshmukh, was married to V. Shantaram, and became known as an actress Sandhya Shantaram. Deshmukh was the mother of actress Ranjana Deshmukh. She died on 12 March 2022, at the age of 92.

Selected filmography

Toofan Aur Deeya (1956) as Dancer
Navrang (1959) as Uma
Iye Marathi Che Nagri (1965)
Ladki Sahyadri Ki (1966)
Mai Mauli (1971)
Asheech Ek Ratra (1971)
Ajab Tuje Sarkar (1971)
Jal Bin Machhli Nritya Bin Bijli (1971) as Bhairavi
Pinjara (1972) as Akka
Naag Panchami (1972) as Goddess Parvati 
Jyotibacha Navas (1975)
Zunj (1975) as Godabai
Varat (1975)
Shoora Mi Vandile (1975)
Farrari (1976) as Shripat's Mother 
Bala Gau Kashi Angai (1977) as Madhuri's mother
Hira Aur Patthar (1977)
Chandra Hota Sakshila (1978)
Suhaag (1979) as Jamnabai
Kashino Dikro (1979)
Patalin (1981) as Kirti's Mother

See also
Marathi cinema

References

External links

1930 births
2022 deaths
20th-century Indian actresses
Actresses in Hindi cinema
Actresses in Marathi cinema